Sandy Campbell may refer to:
Sandy Campbell (British Army officer) (1898–1940), British recipient of the George Cross in World War II
Sandy Campbell (actor) (1922–1988), American actor
Sandy Campbell (canoeist) (born 1946), American slalom canoeist
Sandy Campbell (rugby league) (born 1966), Australian rugby league player
Sandy Campbell (singer), American actress and singer

See also
Sandra Campbell (disambiguation)
Alexander Campbell (disambiguation)